The 19th Central American and Caribbean Junior Championships were held in the Estadio Jorge "Mágico" González in San Salvador, El Salvador, between 29 June and 1 July 2012.  The event was open for athletes from the invited countries, that are members of the Central American and Caribbean Athletic Confederation (CACAC), in two categories (newly defined in 2012): Junior A Category: 18 to 19 years as of 31 December 2012 (born either 1993 or 1994), and Junior B Category: 14 to 17 years as of 31 December 2012 (born in 1995, 1996, 1997, or 1998).  By IAAF standards, Junior A is equal to Junior, while Junior B is equal to Youth.

There were numerous changes as compared to the last competition held in 
2010:
The 17-year-old athletes competed in the Junior B category (rather than Junior
A).  2000 metres steeplechase was replaced by 3000 metres steeplechase in the
female Junior A category.  110 metres hurdles replaced 100 metres hurdles, and
10,000 metres racewalk replaced 5000 metres racewalk in the male Junior B
category.  And finally, in the female Junior B category, 3000 metres, 2000
metres steeplechase, pole vault, and hammer throw (3 kg) were held for the 
first time, while 1500 metres replaced 1200 metres, 400 metres hurdles
replaced  300 metres hurdles, 5000 metres racewalk replaced 4000 metres 
racewalk, and new implements for shot put (3 kg rather than 4 kg) and javelin
(500 g rather 600 g) were used.

In the Junior A category, a lot of athletes were preparing for the 14th World Junior Championships in Barcelona, Spain on 10–15 July 2012.

A detailed discussion of the results was given elsewhere.

Records
A couple of new championship records were set.

Key

Medal summary
The results are published. Events marked as "Exhibition" did not meet the official conditions with respect to the minimum number of participants (“not less than
five (5) competitors of three (3) countries”).

Complete results can also be found on the World Junior Athletics History website.

Male Junior A (under 20)

Female Junior A (under 20)

Male Junior B (under 18)

Female Junior B  (under 18)

Medal table
The published medal count is based on 77 events, and does not include the events indicated above as exhibition.

Participation (unofficial)
Different numbers were published.  One source announces 526 athletes from 28
countries.  Another source reports the participation of 652 athletes and officials.  This is in agreement with the officially published team roster, comprising 521 athletes and 131 officials from 29 countries.  Working through the results, an unofficial count yields the number of about 467 athletes (203 junior, 264 youth) in the start list.  Following, the numbers in brackets refer to (athletes in published team roster/athletes in start list):

 (4/3)
 (5/4)
 (1)
 (48/44)
 (22/21)
 (9/6)
 (11/12)
 (12/10)
 (6)
 (21/19)
 (12/11)
 Curaçao (10/5)
 (4/1)
 (22/21)
 (46/45)
 (3)
 (51/42)
 Haïti (3/1)
 (9/7)
 (70/58)
 México (39/37)
 (5/4)
 (38)
 (14/15)
 (4)
 (5)
 (41)
 (2/1)
 (4/2)

References

External links
Official meet website 
Official CACAC website
Results (archived)

Central American and Caribbean Junior Championships in Athletics
Central American and Caribbean Junior Championships
2012 in Salvadoran sport
Athl
Athl
International athletics competitions hosted by El Salvador
2012 in youth sport